Peperomia vueltasana is a herb and epiphyte species of Peperomia plant native to Nicaragua to Panama. It primarily grows in wet tropical biomes.

Etymology
vueltasana came from Las Vueltas, in Tucurrique district, Costa Rica.

Description
It is a moderately small, assurgent, glabrous herb. It has a stem (rather slender) of 2 mm rooting from the lower nodes. Leaves are alternate, lanceolate, or oblanceolate that are acute at both ends or somewhat mucronate, the lower end was reduced and bluntly obovate. Some specimens can be found in the Caribbean slope of Costa Rica.

References

vueltasana
Flora of Central America
Flora of Nicaragua
Flora of Costa Rica
Flora of Panama
Plants described in 1929
Taxa named by William Trelease